Nyhavn 61 is an 18th-century residential building overlooking the Nyhavn canal in central Copenhagen, Denmark. The building was listed in the Danish registry of protected buildings and places in 1945. The scope of the heritage listing was expanded in 1984. Nyhavn 61 and Nyhavn 59 have now been merged into a single property and are physically integrated on the third floor. The two buildings share a central courtyard.

History

Thecoppersmith Henrik Ehm purchased a large property at the site in 1682, comprising all the properties now known as Nyhavn5969 and Kvæsthusgade 24. His property was listed in Copenhagen's first cadastre of 1689 asNo. 20 in St. Ann's East Quarter.

The property was later divided into a number of smaller properties. The building now known as Nyhavn 61 was constructed for Ehm as a tenement house in around 1700. It was then a five-bays-wide, half-timbered building with a facade crowned by a two-bays wide gabled wall dormer. The facade was reconstructed in brick some time between 1715 and 1748.It was listed in the new cadastre of 1756 as No. 31 in St. Ann's East Quarter and was owned by skipper Ole Olsen at that time.

The building was heightened with one storey and a Mansard roof in 1778. The property was later acquired by skipper Henning Peter Bohn. He resided in the building with his wife Margaretha Ips Datter, their seven children (aged three to 13), one maid and one lodger (another skipper) at the time of the 1787 census..

Peter Hansen Bestrup	
The property was later acquired by  skipper Peter H. Bestrup. His property was home to two households at the time of the 1801 census. Peter H. Bestrup resided in the building with his wife Rebecca Jonasdatter, their seven children (aged three to 19) and one maid. Hans Jensen Giese, another skipper, resided in the building with his wife Anne Kirstine Jessen, their four children (aged one to 12), his brother 	Peter Jensen Giese	 (skipper, away at the moment) and one maid. Christian Nielsenm a third skipper, resided on his own in a third apartment (but was away).

Bistrup's apartment was again listed as No. 31 in the new cadastre of 1806.

The mew 87-year-old Peter Hansen Bistrup was still residing on the first floor at the time of the 1840 census. He lived there with his son Peter Frederik Bistrup and daughter-in-law Caroline Bistrup, their three children (aged 14 to 23) and one maid. Asmus Andersen Kruse, a skipper, resided on the ground floor with his wife 	Ulrikke Magrethe Kruse and their 16-year-old daughter Marie Magrete Kruse. Sophie Hedevig Olsen, a widow, resided on the second floor with one lodger. Andreas Madsen, a coachman, resided in the basement with his wife Engeborg Madsen and six children (aged two to 14).

1750 census
The property was home to 22 residents in four households at the 1850 census. Christian Sørensen, a 60-year-old man, resided on the first floor with one maid and three lodgers. Hans Christian Hansen, a typographer, resided on the second floor with his wife H. Frederikkem their daughter 	Wilhelmine Marie and the lodger Wilhelm Malling. Johan Frederik Sporlæder, a mate (styrmand), resided on the third floor with his wife Anne Christine, their two children (aged four and eight) and three lodgers. Lars Nielsen, a workman, resided in the basement with his wife Cathrine Emilie and their four children (aged 1 to eight).

1860 census
 
The property was home to 29 residents in four households at the 1860 census. Anthon Gravengaard, a barkeeper, resided in the building with his wife Ingeborg Gravengaard (née Moe)m their two children (aged three and 15), one male servant, one maid and three lodgers. Lars Hansen, another barkeeper, resided in the building with his wife Ane Magrethe Hansen and their 29-year-old son Lars Christian William Hansen. Theodor Ernst Petersen, an organist at the 11h Brigade, resided in the building with his wife Johanne Marie Petersen f. Rothe, their one-year-old daughter Udøbt Pigebarn and three maids. Andreas Simmelhag, a businessman (Vare og Vexelmægler), resided in the building with his seven children (aged seven to 27) and two maids.

Later history

The property was owned by master tailor O.M. Holm in the 1770s and 1890s.

In 1902, C. O. Nielsen purchased the building. It was subsequently adapted for use as a hotel. It was operated under the bane Hotel Swea.

In 1929, G.M. Nilsson purchased the building. In 1940, she integrated No. 61 and No. 59. The architect Mogens Black-Petersen merged the third floor of No. 61 and No. 59.

Oscar Kretzschmer (1899-), a businessman and manufacturer, purchased the property in 1970.

Architecture
The building is constructed with four storeys over a walk-put basement and is just four bays wide. The plastered, yellow-painted facade is finished with a belt course above the ground flor, a sill course below the first-floor windows and a simple cornice below the roof. The main entrance is located in the bay furthest to the east. It is topped by a transom widow. The basement entrance next to it is flanked by cast iron railings shaped as griffons. The rear side of the building is constructed in undressed brick on the ground floor, followed by two storeys with red-painted timber framing and yellow-painted infills, and finally a Mansard roof. A three-storey side wing extends from the rear side of the building and is itself attached to a two-storey rear wing. These two wings are both constructed in brick. They are both dressed and yellow-painted, with monopitched red tile roofs. The building shares a central courtyard with Nyhavn 59.<refname="Kulturstyrelsen"/>

Today
Nyhavn 59 os tpdau owned by  APS Kbus 17 Nr. 3421.

References

External links

 Images

Listed residential buildings in Copenhagen